Cyril Gore Crawford (13 March 1902 – 17 June 1988) was a cricketer who played first-class cricket for Canterbury from 1921 to 1932 and played for New Zealand in the days before New Zealand played Test cricket.

A middle-order batsman, Crawford struggled to establish a place in the Canterbury side until he scored 61 against the touring New South Wales team in 1923–24, when he "played the soundest cricket of any one on the side" and "more than justified his inclusion". The next season, against the Victorians, he made 70 batting at number three, when he "gave a sound exhibition of batting" and "made quite a lot of fine scoring shots", particularly the cut.

He toured Australia with the New Zealand team in 1925–26, but failed in his two matches against state teams, although he scored 121 in a two-day match against a Northern Districts of New South Wales XI in the last match of the tour. He played a few more Plunket Shield matches over subsequent seasons with little success.

Crawford was a stalwart of the St Albans club in Christchurch, playing 223 matches over nearly 30 years. He was a life member of the Canterbury Cricket Association.

References

External links
Cyril Crawford at CricketArchive

1902 births
1988 deaths
New Zealand cricketers
Pre-1930 New Zealand representative cricketers
Canterbury cricketers
Cricketers from Christchurch